is a former Japanese football player.

Playing career
Morikawa was born in Hamamatsu on July 11, 1977. After graduating from Shizuoka Gakuen High School, he joined J1 League club Kashiwa Reysol in 1996. In 1998, he played many matches as left defender of three backs defense and defensive midfielder. However he could not play at all in the match in 1999. In April 1999, he moved to newly was promoted to J2 League club, Kawasaki Frontale. He became a regular player as left defender of three backs defense. The club also won the champions in 1999 and was promoted to J1 from 2000. However his opportunity to play decreased in 2000. Although the club won the 2nd place J.League Cup, the club was relegated to J2 in a year. In 2001, he moved to newly was promoted to J1 League club, Consadole Sapporo on loan. In 2002, he returned to Kashiwa Reysol. However he could hardly play in the match. In 2003, he moved to Vegalta Sendai. Although the club was relegated to J2 from 2004, he became a regular player from 2004. In 2006, he moved to Japan Football League club Rosso Kumamoto. Although he played as regular player in 2006, his opportunity to play decreased for injury in 2007 and retired end of 2007 season.

Club statistics

References

External links

1977 births
Living people
Association football people from Shizuoka Prefecture
Japanese footballers
J1 League players
J2 League players
Japan Football League players
Kashiwa Reysol players
Kawasaki Frontale players
Hokkaido Consadole Sapporo players
Vegalta Sendai players
Roasso Kumamoto players
Association football defenders